The Tryon Resolves were a brief declaration adopted by the citizens of Tryon County in the Province of North Carolina in the early days of the American Revolution. In the Resolves, the county vowed resistance to coercive actions by the government of Great Britain against its North American colonies. The document was signed on August 14, 1775.

Background
The Tryon Resolves "association" was created in response to the Battle of Lexington, and the Resolves were among the earliest of many local colonial declarations against the policies the British government had instituted in the colonies, which were considered oppressive by the colonists. Other similar declarations from the same period included the Mecklenburg Resolves (adopted in nearby Mecklenburg County, North Carolina) and the Suffolk Resolves (adopted in Suffolk County, Massachusetts). The Tryon Resolves predated the United States Declaration of Independence by almost 11 months, but stopped short of proscribing independence from Britain, instead supporting armed resistance until a resolution with England could be made.

As tensions between the North American colonies and the British government continued to increase, county residents began forming Committees of Safety to prepare militia companies for a potential war. On September 14, 1775, many of the signers of the Tryon Resolves formed the Tryon County Militia in preparation for British retaliation against American revolutionaries.Sullivan, Kathy Gunter;  "Tryon County Documents, 1769-1779"; Genealogical Society of Old Tyron County, NC; (2000);  via "Proceedings of the Committee of Safety, 1775-1776;"  Secretary of State Papers; S.S. 305; pp. 184–186

Text summary and effect

In the Tryon Resolves:
 The county residents refer to "the painful necessity of having recourse to arms in defense of our National freedom and constitutional rights, against all invasions;
 Vow to take up arms and risk our lives and our fortunes in maintaining the freedom of our country..."
 The colonists declare they will continue to follow the Continental Congress or Provincial Conventions in defiance of British declarations that these were illegal;
 The signers warn that force will be met with force until such a time as a "reconciliation" can be made between the colonies and Britain.

Signers
The signatories of the Tryon Resolves were:

 Robt. Alexander
 Jas. Baird
 Abel Beatty
 Thomas Beatty
 John Beeman
 George Black
 James Buchanan
 Christian Carpenter
 Samuel Carpenter
 James Coburn
 Jacob Costner
 Geo. Dellinger
 John Dellinger
 Thomas Espey
 Jacob Forney
 William Graham
 Frederick Hambright
 Andrew Hampton
 Benjamin Hardin
 Joseph Hardin
 Robert Hulclip (Original document: Robert Hazelip, age 16, misprint on plaque due to ink stain)
 David Jenkins
 Joseph Kuykendall
 Samuel Loftin
 Jas. Logan
 Perrygreen Mackness (or Magness) 
 Jacob Mauney, Jun.
 Valentine Mauney
 Fried Mauser
 James McAfee
 Charles McLean
 Jas. Miller
 Moses Moore
 John Morris
 Andrew Neel
 Joseph Neel
 George Paris
 Jonathan Price
 John Robison
 Peter Sides
 Adam Simms
 Samuel Smith
 William Thompson
 Joab Turner
 Richard Waffer
 John Walker
 John Wells
 Davis Whiteside
 William Whiteside

References

External links
 Journeys Through Time: Nixon's History of Lincoln County: The Revolutionary War Period.  
 Revolutionary Dig Saving Local History 

1775 documents
1775 in North Carolina
Documents of the American Revolution
North Carolina in the American Revolution
Political history of North Carolina